The list of ship commissionings in 1959 includes a chronological list of all ships commissioned in 1959.


See also

1959
 Ship commissionings